George Fieschi Heneage (22 November 1800 – 11 May 1864) was a British Whig and later Conservative Party politician.

Background
Heneage was the son of George Robert Heneage of Hainton Hall, Lincolnshire and Frances Anne, daughter of Lieutenant-General George Ainslie. His middle name derived from his descent from Roboaldo Fieschi, Conte di Lavagna. He was educated at Eton College (1817) and Trinity College, Cambridge (1818) and succeeded his father to the Hainton estate in 1833.

Political career
Heneage was elected at the 1826 general election as a Member of Parliament (MP) for Great Grimsby, but when he stood for re-election in 1830 he was defeated by the Tory candidate George Harris.

At the 1831 general election Heneage was elected as a Member of Parliament (MP) for Lincoln. He was re-elected in 1832, but did not contest the seat at the 1835 general election.

He did not stand for Parliament again until the 1852 general election, when he was returned as an MP for Lincoln, this time as a Conservative. He was re-elected as a Liberal in 1857 and in 1859, but resigned his seat in January 1862 (by taking the Chiltern Hundreds) in order to contest a by-election in Great Grimsby.  He was defeated in Grimsby by 446 votes to 458, and lodged an election petition against the result. The petition was dismissed, and he did not stand again.

He also served as High Sheriff of Lincolnshire in 1839

Family
Heneage married Frances, daughter of Michael Tasburgh, in 1833. Their son Edward was also a politician and was elevated to the peerage as Baron Heneage in 1896. Frances died in 1842. Heneage remained a widower until his death in May 1864, aged 63.

References

External links 
 

1800 births
1864 deaths
People educated at Eton College
Alumni of Trinity College, Cambridge
High Sheriffs of Lincolnshire
Whig (British political party) MPs for English constituencies
Conservative Party (UK) MPs for English constituencies
Liberal Party (UK) MPs for English constituencies
UK MPs 1826–1830
UK MPs 1831–1832
UK MPs 1832–1835
UK MPs 1852–1857
UK MPs 1857–1859
UK MPs 1859–1865
Politics of Lincoln, England
Members of the Parliament of the United Kingdom for Great Grimsby